Donachie is a surname. Notable people with the surname include:

 David Donachie (born 1944), Scottish novelist
 James Donachie (born 1993), Australian football (soccer) player
 Kaye Donachie (born 1970), British painter
 Patrick Donachie (born 1983), Australian Paralympic swimmer
 Ron Donachie (born 1956), Scottish actor
 Willie Donachie (born 1951), Scottish international football player

Donnachie
Charles Donnachie (born 1869), Scottish football player
Joe Donnachie (born 1885), Scottish international football player

See also
Clan Robertson
Donnachie Cliff
Donaghy (surname)